Micragrotis is a genus of moths of the family Noctuidae. The genus was erected by George Hampson in 1903.

Selected species
Micragrotis lacteata Hampson, 1903
Micragrotis puncticostata Hampson, 1902
Micragrotis strigibasis Hampson, 1902
Micragrotis cinerosa Bethune-Baker, 1911
Micragrotis exusta Hampson, 1903
Micragrotis intendens Walker, 1857
Micragrotis interstriata Hampson, 1902
Micragrotis marwitzi Gaede, 1935
Micragrotis microstigma Hampson, 1903
Micragrotis prosarca Hampson, 1903
Micragrotis rufescens Hampson, 1903

References

Noctuinae